The 7th Ward is a section of New Orleans, Louisiana.  It is geographically the third largest of the 17 Wards of New Orleans, after the 9th Ward and 15th Ward.

Boundaries and geography
The 7th Ward stretches from the Mississippi River to Lake Pontchartrain. The eastern, or "lower" boundary is Elysian Fields Avenue, the boundary with the 8th Ward. In the "up-river" direction to the south-west, the boundary is Esplanade Avenue, the border with the 6th Ward; then from where Esplanade meets Bayou St. John the boundary follows the bayou north to the lake, with the 5th Ward being across the bayou.

Features and landmarks
The London Avenue Canal runs through the ward from just in from Gentilly Ridge to the Lake. Dillard University is in the Ward, as is most of the University of New Orleans campus near the lakefront. The New Orleans Fairgrounds, home to horse racing and the New Orleans Jazz & Heritage Festival, is just back from Esplanade Avenue, as is Saint Louis Cemetery #3. Frenchmen Street, the popular destination for food and live music, is in the front of the ward near the French Quarter.

History
As with most of New Orleans, the area along the high ground of the riverfront was developed first; this area is today the Marigny Triangle of the Faubourg Marigny. The Pontchartrain Railroad, the first US railroad away from the Atlantic coast, ran for a century along Elysian Fields between the Riverfront and the famous camps at Milneburg. The area is known for the Creole citizens who once heavily populated the area.  Esplanade Ridge between Rampart and Bayou St. John was one of the first parts of town substantially developed away from the riverfront.  Some of the elegant early 19th century Creole-style mansions can still be seen along Esplanade. The areas between Gentilly Ridge and the Lakefront was developed in the 20th century with improved drainage; see Drainage in New Orleans.

When Hurricane Katrina struck New Orleans in 2005, the effects were disastrous. The London Avenue Canal breached catastrophically on both sides, flooding the majority of the Ward and the surrounding area. The 7th ward has since seen many residents return.

Notable people

Notable people from the 7th Ward include jazz musicians/composers  Lionel Ferbos, Jelly Roll Morton, director, actor Vernel Bagneris, Barney Bigard, and Sidney Bechet, Allen Toussaint, singer Lee Dorsey, singer Lizzie Miles, Jazz singers Germaine Bazzle, Sharon Martin; actor Anthony Mackie, rapper/producer Mannie Fresh, rapper Mia X, author/commentator Melissa Harris-Perry, civil rights leader A. P. Tureaud, playwright Tyler Perry, authors Brenda Marie Osbey, Mona Lisa Saloy, Fatima Shaik,  singer John Boutte, singer-songwriter Frank Ocean and fellow schoolmate R&B singer Luke James, football players  Tyrann Mathieu  Trai Turner  and Leonard Fournette, boxer Joseph Dorsey Jr., mayors Ernest Morial, Sidney Barthelemy,  and C. Ray Nagin, mathematician Beverly Anderson, rap artists Scott Arceneaux (Scrim) and Aristos Petrou (Ruby da Cherry) of Suicideboys.

References

External links

Wards of New Orleans